Dushtaa is a 2011 Kannada language action-thriller written, produced and directed by S Narayan starring his son, Pankaj Narayan and Surabhi Santosh in the lead roles.

Cast 
Pankaj Narayan as Isha  
 Surabhi Santosh as Pathi

Production

The supporting cast of the film comprises 21 newcomers who were cast after holding auditions throughout Karnataka. The film was shot around Shimoga and Bhadravati districts of Karnataka. It was an attempt at realistic cinema and was based on a real life story which the director witnessed in his formative years in Bhadravati.

Soundtrack
Soundtrack was composed by S. Narayan.
 Eesa Oh Eesa - Rakesh, Kusala
 Premaa Premaa - AR Anantha Krishna
 Sneha - Anoop, Vijay, Banni Mohan, Harsha
 Haalu Hrudayakke - Sadashiva Shenoy
 Nan Hendru - Harsha Remuna
 Jhinke Oh Jhinke - Nakul, Akshara Hari

Release
The film was released on 3 June 2011.

Reception 
Indiaglitz in its review wrote "Bold attempts with realities surrounding plus innocence clubbing is not quite often seen on Kannada screen. Director of high caliber and well informed personality S Narayan makes an out and out different kind of cinema that is a bumper for the masses. In the days of modernity director S Narayan gets in to the villages for this film and made it look very real."  also adding that  "S Narayan as a music director also gets equal marks what he scores for the story, screenplay, and direction. The songs on Prema..friendship.Jinke Mari.are wonderful from the pen of S Narayan. The lyrics are not lost in the music. They are clearly understandable. Some of the lines of S Narayan are haunting ones." while praising the music of the film.

Bharathstudent.com predicted that the film would "find select audience and above average returns" at the box office while reviewing that Dushtaa was a "rustic tale of love, misfortune and stroke of destiny." and "Though the idea is realistic, it doesn't leave the audience with a pleasant feel as the protagonist keeps suffering right from the start. While the first half goes about with the layering of the plot, the second half gets into various twists and turns"

References 

2011 films
Films directed by S. Narayan